The large-eyed green tree snake (Rhamnophis aethiopissa), also known commonly as the splendid dagger-tooth tree snake, is a species of venomous snake in the family Colubridae. The species is endemic to Africa. There are three recognized subspecies.

Geographic range
R. aethiopissa is found in Angola, Cameroon, Central African Republic, Republic of the Congo, Democratic Republic of the Congo, Equatorial Guinea, Gabon, Ghana, Guinea, Ivory Coast, Kenya, Liberia, Senegal, Sierra Leone, South Sudan, Tanzania, Togo, Uganda, and Zambia.

Description
The dorsal scales, which are smooth, are arranged in 17 rows at midbody.

Reproduction
R. aethiopissa is oviparous.

Subspecies
The following three subspecies are recognized as being valid, including the nominotypical subspecies.
Rhamnophis aethiopissa aethiopissa 
Rhamnophis aethiopissa ituriensis 
Rhamnophis aethiopissa elgonensis

Venom
Rhamnophis aethiopissa is a rear-fanged colubrid, i.e., it has venom, which it may be able to inoculate by biting. Because very little is known about this species and its venom, it is necessary to be very cautious when working with it. This species has an almost identical defence mechanism to the boomslang (Dispholidus typus) and twig snakes (genus Thelotornis) as they also inflate their throat to make themselves look bigger. It is believed that the species of the genus Rhamnophis evolved between the boomslang and the species of the genus Thrasops in terms of their fangs and means of envenomation.

References

Further reading
Chippaux J-P, Jackson K (2019). Snakes of Central and Western Africa. Baltimore: Johns Hopkins University Press. 448 pp. . (Thrasops aethiopissa, p. 371).
Günther A (1862). "On new Species of Snakes in the Collection of the British Museum". Annals and Magazine of Natural History, Third Series 9: 124–132 + Plates IX–X. (Rhamnophis æthiopissa, new species, p. 129 + Plate X).
Loveridge A (1929). "East African Reptiles and Amphibians in the United States National Museum". Bulletin of the United States National Museum (151): 1–135. (Rhamnophis aethiopissa elgonensis, new subspecies, pp. 24–26).
Schmidt KP (1923). "Contributions to the Herpetology of the Belgian Congo Based on the Collection of the American Museum Congo Expedition, 1909–1915. Part II.—Snakes". Bulletin of the American Museum of Natural History 49 (1): 1–146. (Rhamnophis ituriensis, new species, pp. 81–83, Figure 4).
Spawls S, Howell K, Hinkel H, Menegon M (2018). Field Guide to East African Reptiles, Second Edition. London: Bloomsbury Natural History. 624 pp. . (Rhamnophis aethiopissa, p. 502).

Reptiles described in 1862
Taxa named by Albert Günther
Reptiles of Africa